Claudia Schubert is a German mezzo-soprano concert singer.

Born in Darmstadt, Schubert studied voice at the Hochschule für Musik und Darstellende Kunst Frankfurt with Elsa Cavelti from 1986 to 1992. She has collaborated and recorded with conductors including Frieder Bernius, Ton Koopman and John Eliot Gardiner.

References

External links 
 Discography (Discogs)
 Claudia Schubert: Salve Regina by Pergolesi (YouTube)

Year of birth missing (living people)
Living people
Musicians from Darmstadt
German operatic mezzo-sopranos
Frankfurt University of Music and Performing Arts alumni